This article is a list of political parties in Republika Srpska, Bosnia and Herzegovina.

Republika Srpska has a multi-party system with numerous political parties, in which no one party often has a chance of gaining power alone, and parties must work with each other to form coalition governments.

List

Parties represented in the National Assembly

Defunct and historical parliamentary parties

References